Officer Career Development Centre (OCDC) is a Sri Lankan military academic establishment providing command and staff courses for mid career  commissioned officers of Sri Lanka Army as well as to limited number of officers from Sri Lanka Navy, Sri Lanka Air Force and officers of various allied forces. It is located in the town of Buttala, it was opened on 23 January 2012 and is affiliated to the Sabaragamuwa University of Sri Lanka. The Naval and Maritime Academy and the Sri Lanka Air Force Junior Command & Staff College conducts similar courses for mid-career officers of the Sri Lanka Navy and the Sri Lanka Air Force.

History 
With the rapid expansion of the Sri Lankan Army with the escalation of the Sri Lankan civil war, the army saw the need to enhance command and staff training for its senior subalterns and junior field officers since it depended on friendly nations for staff college trainings which amounted to a few slots per year. With the re-designation of the former Army Training Centre as the Sri Lanka Military Academy (SLMA) in 1981, the Officers Study Centre (OSC) was established in the SLMA to conduct the Junior Staff Course, the Senior Tactics Course and the Senior Administration Course. aimed at mid-career officers to develop basic command and staff techniques in the British tradition, for staff officer grade III/II appointments (Officers in the ranks of Lieutenant / Captain / Major). With end of the civil war, the Army established the Officer Career Development Centre in 2012 as a junior staff college with the Junior Command Course (JCC) and the Junior Staff Course (JSC) transferred to it from the OSC. OCDC initiated the Senior Command Course, which has been redesignated as the Unit Command Course for prospective battalion commanders. In 2021, work has commenced to redesignate the OCDC as the Army War College.

Courses
 Unit Command Course (UCC) - 13 week course aimed at Lieutenant Colonels and Majors to become successful battalion commanders. 
 Junior Command Course (JCC) - 13 week course aimed at Majors and Captains to become successful grade II level command, staff, and instructional appointments.  
 Junior Staff Course (JSC) - 13 week course aimed at Captains and Lieutenants to become successful grade III level staff appointments.

See also
Higher Command and Staff Course
Defence Services Command and Staff College
Army School of Logistics
Naval and Maritime Academy
Sri Lanka Air Force Junior Command & Staff College
Army War College, Mhow

References

External links
SLA Officer Career Development Centre

Training establishments of the Sri Lanka Army
Staff colleges in Sri Lanka
Educational institutions established in 2012
Education in Sabaragamuwa Province
2012 establishments in Sri Lanka